Boris Viktorovich Nikonorov (born 3 April 1989) is a Russian beach soccer player. He is the all-time leader by number of goals for Lokomotiv Moscow, where he plays since 2017.

Achievements

National team
 FIFA Beach Soccer World Cup champion: 2021
 Euro Beach Soccer League champion: 2017

Clubs
 Russian National champion:  2017 
 Mundialito de Clubes champion: 2017

Individually
 2017 BSWW Rising Star

References

External links
 Profile on Beach Soccer Russia

Russian beach soccer players
1989 births
Living people
Sportspeople from Yaroslavl Oblast